The Artillery Battalion is the Norwegian army's Brigade Nords artillery battalion. The unit numbers some 550 soldiers and officers.

The battalion's main weapons are K9 Thunder self-propelled howitzers and NASAMS III air-defence system.

Organization 
The battalion consists of five batteries and the battalion HQ:

 Cannon batteries: Nils, Olga and Petter
 Staff Battery
 Locating Battery 
 SHORAD Battery

Batteries N, O and P are the gun batteries.  Nils and Olga are situated at Setermoen Camp, while Piraja is situated at Rena. The two 'old timer' batteries, Nils and Olga, each have a gun platoon (manning the howitzers), an OP platoon (Observation Post platoon, moving with the unit being supported and acquiring targets) and a command platoon (collects and processes data, issues firing data). The fresh battery Petter only has a gun platoon and a command platoon, but is being set up with an OP platoon. In addition, Nils and Olga has contributions to the Provincial Reconstruction Team (PRT) in Meymaneh, Afghanistan.

HQ battery consists of support and supply personnel. They provide the gun batteries with the resources they need to fight (ammunition, distance, elevation and weather data and security). In addition, they garrison Setermoen camp and serves as guards and medics during exercises.

The STA (Surveillance and Target Acquisition) Battery comprises two artillery ranger (Artillerijeger) platoons, who moves in forward positions and conducts JTAC missions. 

The battalion also has a WLS-platoon (radar), that is used in counter-battery fire. When enemy artillery fires, the WLS radar detects the projectile and uses its trajectory to calculate where it was fired from. This data is then sent to the ILS and the cannon battery staffs, which in turn use this to coordinate the cannons in an effort to take out the enemy battery.

The Batteries

Battery Nils 
Based at Setermoen, Nils Battery is the oldest battery still in service with the Norwegian Army. It can trace its footsteps back to pre-World War II times. During the late 1990s it was the only gun battery in operation, until the MLRS system was introduced, though at that time it was a great deal bigger than its current size. Since Nils Battery's mascot is a bear, it is called the Army's Slagbjørn ("Slagbjørn" being the Norwegian designation of a bear that has attacked people or livestock and should thus be considered a danger). After supporting the 2. Bataljon for a few years, Nils battery is now supporting the Norwegian Panserbatalion.

Battery Olga 
Olga Battery was created in 1947, as a part of the artillery regiment which served under Tysklandsbrigaden, Norway's force participation in the post-war occupation of Germany. After the occupation it was relocated to Setermoen. It continued to serve until the 1990s, when many units in the Norwegian Armed Forces were disbanded after the collapse of the Soviet Union in 1991 and the end of the threat of full-scale invasion. The battery was reformed on June 21, 2006, and assigned to the Panserbataljonen at Setermoen. After a few years however, the roles were changed and battery Olga is now supporting 2. Bataljon. Its howitzers are named after stars of the Ursa Major constellation.

During its stay in Germany, the battery adopted a wild boar piglet that had lost its parents to poachers. The boar was named Corporal Oscar and became the battery's mascot. Because of its "rank", all privates had to salute it. As it grew up it became uncontrollable and dangerous and had to be put down. When the battery was reformed in 2006, the battery commander, captain Tom Patrick Scarlett, was given a new wild boar piglet as a ceremonial gift. The new piglet was named Corporal Oscar II, inheriting the rank of its predecessor and also enjoying the mandatory salutes of soldiers serving in Olga battery. He is a familiar sight walking mostly free around in Setermoen camp.

Battery Petter 
Battery Petter was re-established in 2006 (it also existed in the 70s, 80s and 90s) and is assigned to Telemarkbataljonen at Rena as part of the new Rapid Reaction Force of the Norwegian Army. It is also the only gun battery in the battalion to field exclusively professional soldiers.

References

External links 
 The battalion's official page on the Norwegian Armed Forces homepage 

Battalions of Norway
Artillery units and formations